The EuroBasket Women 2017 final was played at the O2 Arena in Prague, the Czech Republic, on 25 June 2017, between Spain and France.

Spain won the title for the third time.

Road to the final

|bgcolor=#F7F6A8|First Round
|colspan=2 align=center|

|}
|- valign=top bgcolor=#F7F6A8
|Opponent
|Result
|bgcolor=#F7F6A8|
|Opponent
|Result
|-
|align=left|
|67–47
|bgcolor=#F7F6A8|Quarterfinals
|align=left|
|67–40
|-
|align=left|
|68–52
|bgcolor=#F7F6A8|Semifinals
|align=left|
|77–55
|}

Match details

External links
Official website

final
2016–17 in Spanish basketball
2016–17 in French basketball
Spain women's national basketball team games
France women's national basketball team games
2017
Sports competitions in Prague
2010s in Prague
France–Spain relations